Virve Laev ( Murre; born 1928) is an Estonian film editor best known for her work in film documentary drama in the 1970s.

She entered film in 1969 working on the adventure picture Viimne reliikvia with director Grigori Kromanov.

Filmography
1963 "Jalgrattataltsutajad"
1967 "Viini postmark"
1969 "Viimne reliikvia"
1970 "Metskapten"
1973 "Tavatu lugu"
1974 ""Ooperiball"
1975 "Briljandid proletariaadi diktatuurile"
1976 "Aeg elada, aeg armastada"
1977 "Karikakramäng"

References

External links

Estonian film editors
Possibly living people
Year of birth missing